Luke Thomas Simpson (born 23 September 1994) is an English professional footballer who plays as a goalkeeper. He last played for Kidderminster Harriers, and has also played in the Football League for Accrington Stanley.

Simpson started his career with Oldham Athletic's youth system and signed a professional contract with the club in June 2013. He had loan spells with Nantwich Town, Workington and Leicester City. He had spells with Accrington Stanley and Watford before spending two seasons with York City from 2016 to 2018.

Playing career
Born in Heywood, Greater Manchester, Simpson started his career as a youth player at Oldham Athletic, signing his first professional contract in June 2013. Having been an unused substitute for Oldham's first three matches of the 2013–14 season, he joined Northern Premier League Premier Division club Nantwich Town on 17 August 2013 on a one-month loan. On 20 December 2013, Simpson joined Conference North club Workington on a one-month youth loan, going on to make six appearances. On 31 January 2014, he joined Championship club Leicester City on a youth loan until the end of 2013–14.

He signed for League Two club Accrington Stanley on 4 August 2014. Simpson made his debut against Southend United, saving Barry Corr's 46th-minute penalty. In January 2015, he left the club after turning down a contract offer. He made nine appearances for the club in all competitions.

On 14 December 2015, Simpson signed with Premier League club Watford, to play for the under-21 team. He was released at the end of the 2015–16 season.

Simpson joined newly relegated National League club York City on 25 July 2016 on a two-year contract. He was an unused substitute as York beat Macclesfield Town 3–2 at Wembley Stadium in the 2017 FA Trophy Final. Simpson made one appearance as York ranked in 11th place in the National League North in 2017–18. He left the club at the expiry of his contract.

Simpson signed with newly promoted League Two club Macclesfield Town on 2 August 2018.

Simpson signed for Southern League Premier Division Central club Tamworth on 31 December 2018, following an injury to first-choice goalkeeper Jasbir Singh. He made his debut the following day, starting in a 3–3 draw at home to Barwell in the league. He made five appearances before leaving the club on 11 February following Singh's return to fitness.

Following leaving Tamworth, Simpson signed for Wrexham on 23 February 2019 until the end of the 2018–19 season.

Simpson joined Barrow on 25 November 2019. He left the club at the end of the 2019–20 season.

In October 2020, Simpson joined National League North side, Kidderminster Harriers, playing all 17 competitive fixtures that year before the season was curtailed due to Covid-19. Simpson signed a new 18 month contract for the club in February 2021. Following the 2021-22 season, Simpson opted against renewing his contract, citing personal reasons.

Simpson signed for The New Saints F.C. in October 2022 on a 12 month contract. https://www.tnsfc.co.uk/2022/10/20/welcome-to-park-hall-luke-simpson/

Career statistics

Honours
York City
FA Trophy: 2016–17

Barrow A.F.C. 
National League 2019-20: 2019-20

References

1994 births
Living people
People from Heywood, Greater Manchester
Footballers from Greater Manchester
English footballers
Association football goalkeepers
Oldham Athletic A.F.C. players
Nantwich Town F.C. players
Workington A.F.C. players
Leicester City F.C. players
Accrington Stanley F.C. players
Watford F.C. players
York City F.C. players
Macclesfield Town F.C. players
Tamworth F.C. players
Wrexham A.F.C. players
Barrow A.F.C. players
Kidderminster Harriers F.C. players
The New Saints F.C. players
Northern Premier League players
National League (English football) players
English Football League players
Southern Football League players